Thomas Ashton  may refer to:

Thomas Ashton (schoolmaster) (died 1578), English clergyman and schoolmaster
Thomas Ashton (divine) (1716–1775), English cleric
Thomas Ashton (cotton spinner) (1841–1919), British trade union leader
Thomas Ashton (trade unionist) (1844–1927), British trade unionist and member of the Privy Council
Thomas Ashton (industrialist) (1818–1898), English cotton manufacturer and philanthropist
Thomas Ashton, 1st Baron Ashton of Hyde (1855–1933), British industrialist, philanthropist, Liberal
Thomas Ashton, 2nd Baron Ashton of Hyde (1901–1983), eldest surviving son of Thomas Ashton, 1ste Baron Ashton
Thomas Ashton, 3rd Baron Ashton of Hyde (1926–2008), eldest son of Thomas Ashton, 2nd Baron Ashton
Thomas Ashton, 4th Baron Ashton of Hyde (born 1958), eldest son of Thomas Ashton, 3rd Baron Ashton
T. S. Ashton (Thomas Southcliffe Ashton, 1899–1968), English economic historian
Tom Ashton, British musician

See also
Thomas de Ashton (disambiguation)
Thomas Aston (disambiguation)